Melanogaster is a genus of fungus that resemble truffles, and are often mistaken for them. However, they do not have the characteristic aroma and value of truffles, although some have been used culinarily. None are known to be poisonous. The genus contains 25 species that collectively have a widespread distribution.

A new polyene pigment, melanocrocin, has been isolated either from fruit bodies or mycelial cultures of the subterranean fungus Melanogaster broomeianus. The structure of the pigment was determined by spectroscopic methods and chemical transformations. Melanocrocin is the N-acyl derivative of L-phenylalanine methyl ester with a polyolefinic carboxylic acid.

Species

Melanogaster ambiguus
Melanogaster broomeiani
Melanogaster variegatus
Melanogaster tuberiformis
Melanogaster broomeianus
Melanogaster wilsonii

References

External links

Boletales
Boletales genera
Taxa named by August Carl Joseph Corda